John Leonard Schwartzman, A.S.C. (born October 18, 1960) is an American cinematographer, best known for his work on Jurassic World, The Amazing Spider-Man, The Rock and Seabiscuit, for which he received an Oscar nomination for Best Cinematography.

Early life
Schwartzman was born on October 18, 1960 in Los Angeles, California. He is the son of producer Jack Schwartzman and stepson of actress Talia Shire. He is the brother of Stephanie Schwartzman and half-brother to actors/musicians Jason Schwartzman and Robert Schwartzman. John graduated from the University of Southern California School of Cinematic Arts in 1985. His father was Jewish, whereas his mother Catholic.

Career
Schwartzman works as a cinematographer. He is best known for his collaborations with directors Michael Bay, John Lee Hancock, Colin Trevorrow, James Foley and Paul Feig.

Filmography

Film

Music videos

See also
Coppola family tree

References

External links
 Official website
 Profile, imdb.com
 

1960 births
Living people
American cinematographers
American people of Polish-Jewish descent
Coppola family
People from Los Angeles
USC School of Cinematic Arts alumni